Narayana Multispeciality Hospital, Jaipur is a tertiary care hospital of the Narayana Health Group in Jaipur, Rajasthan, India. It treats patients from Rajasthan and other neighbouring states. The hospital is accredited by the Joint Commission (JCI)  and is the first hospital in Rajasthan to obtain this accreditation. It was commissioned in 2011 in Sanganer, with cardiology, neurosciences, orthopaedics and nephrology its main specialities.

The hospital provides congenital defect surgery and coronary artery bypass graft surgery, minimally invasive cardiac surgery and vascular surgery for adults and children. Its nephrology department operates a dialysis unit in conjunction with a renal transplant program. Reconstructive urology surgery, laser surgery and prostate treatments are its other specializations.

On 23 March 2022, the Liver Transplant team at Narayana Multispeciality Hospital, Jaipur successfully conducted its first Live Donor Liver Transplant (LDLR), making it amongst the top few multi-organ transplant centers in Northern India. This highly complex procedure lasted for over 12 hours.

Narayana Multispeciality Hospital, Jaipur offers comprehensive care across 37 specialties which includes its six Centers of Excellence - Cardiology & Cardio-vascular surgery, Medical & Surgical Gastroenterology, Orthopaedics & Joint Replacement, Renal Sciences & Kidney Transplant, Medical & Surgical Oncology (Cancer) and Critical Care Medicine.

Milestones achieved

32,500+ Cardiac procedures performed which includes Angioplasties, Complex Congenital Surgeries, Coronary Bypass Grafting with Advanced Techniques like Beating Heart Surgeries, Minimally Invasive Cardiac Surgery and other Valvular and Vascular Surgeries

87,000+ dialysis sessions done till date which includes an active and very successful kidney transplant programme by internationally trained transplant experts

4700+ Neuro-surgeries performed which includes Endoscopic Surgery of all types of brain tumours, Brain Vascular Surgery, Aneurysm & AVM Surgery, Minimally Invasive Spine Surgery, Spine fixation & Surgery for spinal tumours, Brain Endoscopy and treatment of Hydrocephalus

7,00,000+ patients treated in the last 7 years (since inception)

Awards
 2016: "Quality beyond Accreditation" at the international conclave of the Association of Health Care Providers (India) (AHPI) held at Mumbai.

External links
 Official Website

References

Hospitals in Rajasthan
Narayana Health
Hospitals established in 2011
2011 establishments in Rajasthan